B22 or B-22 may refer to:

Science and technology
 B22, a bayonet mount size for a light bulb
 B22, an iceberg that calved from the Thwaites Ice Tongue in 2002
 HLA-B22, an HLA-B serotype
 AIDS dementia complex (ICD-10 code)

Transportation
 Bundesstraße 22, a German road
 Chery B22, a 2008 Chinese Chery Automobile model
 Douglas XB-22, a proposed modification of the B-18 Bolo bomber
 MWfly B22, an Italian aircraft engine design
 Micro Aviation B22 Bantam, a New Zealand ultralight aircraft design

Other uses
 Sicilian Defence (ECO code), in chess